Inquisitor hedleyi is a species of sea snail, a marine gastropod mollusk in the family Pseudomelatomidae.

Description
The length of the shell attains 18.6 mm, its diameter 4.5 mm.

(Original description) The solid, narrow shell has an elongate-fusiform shape. It consists of 9 whorls, including the protoconch of 3 convex smooth whorls, with a deep impressed suture. The -whorls of the spire are convex, roundly angled below the middle in the early whorls, above it in the later, slightly adpressed below the linear suture. The body whorl is concavely attenuate at the base. The aperture is narrow, elongate-oval, ending in a moderately long open siphonal canal, which expands slightly in front, bends a little to the left, and is barely recurved. The outer lip is thick, sharp-edged, with a deep oblique posterior sinus of three-quarters of a circle, having a thickened reflected margin, and separated from the base of the whorl by a callous pad derived from the inner lip. Then it is straightly convex, with a wide, very shallow excavation at the base of the siphonal canal. The inner lip is complete, applied, smooth. The columella is long and nearly straight. The axial ribs are oblique, fading out above the angle, rounded, nearly as wide as the spaces, ten in the penultimate whorl, absent from the base. The spiral lirae are crowded, fourteen in the penultimate, whorl, very close-set on the base, granulated by fine accremental striae. The colour in a fresh cotype is dull-white, with faint-brown clouding between the ribs, and a faint-brown band above the suture and round the periphery of the body whorl

Distribution
This marine is endemic to Australia and occurs off South Australia.

References

  Hedley, C. 1922. A revision of the Australian Turridae. Records of the Australian Museum 13(6): 213-359, pls 42-56 
 Wells, F.E. 1994. A revision of the Recent Australian species of the turrid genera Inquisitor and Ptychobela. Journal of the Malacological Society of Australasia 15: 71-102

External links
 

hedleyi
Gastropods of Australia
Gastropods described in 1909